This article lists significant public places in the city of Jerusalem.

Neighborhoods

Major thoroughfares
 Bethlehem Road (part of Highway 60)
 Hebron Road-King David Street-Bar-Lev Boulevard
 Begin Expressway
 Ben Yehuda Street
 Emek Refaim Street
 Golomb-Herzog-Ben-Zvi Boulevard
 Herzl Boulevard
 Jaffa Road
 King George Street
 Gaza Street
 Keren HaYesod Street
 Yigael Yadin Boulevard

Landmarks
 American Colony
 Menachem Begin Heritage Center
 Chords Bridge
 David's Citadel
 Jerusalem YMCA
 Jerusalem War Cemetery
 Montefiore Windmill
 Mormon University, Mt. Scopus
 Russian Compound
 Safra Square
 Tolerance Monument
 Yad Kennedy
 Yad Vashem
 Teddy Fountain

Parks
 Ammunition Hill
 Independence Park
 Jerusalem Botanical Gardens
 Gilo Park
 HaMifletzet Park (Monster Park) with Niki de Saint Phalle's Golem
 Liberty Bell Park
 Nayot Park
 Peace Forest
 Ramat Denya Park
 Sacher Park
 Sherover Promenade
 Train Track Park
 Valley of the Cross
 Wohl Rose Garden

Ancient tombs
 Cave of the Ramban
 David's Tomb
 Garden Tomb
 Herod Family Tomb
 Holy Sepulchre
 Jason's Tomb
 Tomb of Absalom
 Tomb of Simeon the Just
 Tomb of the Prophets Haggai, Zechariah and Malachi
 Tomb of the Virgin Mary
 Tomb of Zechariah
 Tombs of the Kings
 Tombs of the Sanhedrin

Caves, tunnels and quarries
 Siloam Tunnel
 Warren's Shaft
 Zedekiah's Cave

Museums
 Israel Museum – the national museum of Israel
 Shrine of the Book
 Bible Lands Museum Jerusalem
 Bloomfield Science Museum
 Herzl Museum
 Jerusalem Tax Museum
 L.A. Mayer Institute for Islamic Art
 Museum on the Seam
 Museum of Italian Jewish Art
 Natural History Museum
 Rockefeller Museum of Archeology; now administered as part of the Israel Museum
 Siebenberg House – private archaeology museum in the Old City
 Ticho House; now administered as part of the Israel Museum
 Tower of David Museum of the History of Jerusalem
 Yad Vashem Holocaust Museum

Hospitals
 ALYN Hospital Pediatric and Adolescent Rehabilitation Center
 Augusta Victoria Hospital
 Bikur Cholim Hospital
 Hadassah Medical Center (Hadassah hospital), Mount Scopus
 Hadassah Medical Center (Hadassah hospital), Ein Kerem
 Herzog Hospital (Ezrat Nashim)
 Kfar Shaul Mental Health Center
 Misgav Ladach (now a Kupat Holim diagnostic center)
 Makassed Hospital (al-Maqasid; al-Quds University Hospital)
 Shaare Zedek Medical Center
 St. John Ophthalmic Hospital
 St. Joseph Hospital
 French Hospice

Hotels
 Agripas Boutique Hotel
 American Colony Hotel
 Mount of Olives Hotel
 King David Hotel
 David Citadel Hotel
 Jerusalem Gate Hotel
 Jerusalem Plaza Hotel
 Inbal Hotel
 Jerusalem Pearl Hotel
 Three Arches Hotel
 Mount Zion Hotel
 Ramada Renaissance Hotel
 Little House in Bakah
 Scottish Guesthouse
 Prima Royale hotel
 Prima Kings hotel
 Dan Panorama Hotel
 Ramat Rachel Hotel
 Seven Arches Hotel
 The Olive Tree Hotel
 Lev Yerushalayim Hotel

Government institutions
 Bank of Israel
 Knesset – the Israeli parliament
 Supreme Court of Israel

Educational institutions

Universities and colleges

 Al-Quds University
 Bezalel Academy of Art and Design
 Brigham Young University Jerusalem Center - University owned by the Church of Jesus Christ of Latter-day Saints
 Hebrew University of Jerusalem
 Jerusalem College of Engineering
 Jerusalem College of Technology
 L'Ecole Biblique et Archeologique Francaise
 David Yellin Teachers' College
 Emuna College
 Hadassah School of Medicine
 Hadassah College
 Hebrew Union College

Yeshivas
 Ateret Cohanim
 Beit El Synagogue, for Sephardi students of Kabbalah
 Brisk yeshivas
 Conservative Yeshiva
 Kol Torah Yeshiva
 Lakewood East (Israeli branch of Lakewood yeshiva)
 Mercaz HaRav
 Mirrer Yeshiva
 Porat Yosef Yeshiva
 Pressburg Yeshiva
 Sfas Emes Yeshiva
 Shaar Hashamayim Yeshiva, for Ashkenazi students of Kabbalah
 Torah Ore
 Toldot Yeshurun-Yeshiva for Russian Speakers
 Yeshivat Eretz HaTzvi
 Yeshivat HaKotel
 Yeshivat Torat Shraga

Religious sites

In ruins
 Church of St. Mary of the Germans
 Nea Ekklesia of the Theotokos

Multiple religions
 Chapel of the Ascension – part of a mosque, but venerated by most Christian denominations
 Mount Zion
 Cenacle – now state property, not part of any church
 Temple Mount
 Well of Souls or Holy of Holies, the cave under the Dome of the Rock

Jewish

Christian

Multiple denominational
 Church of the Holy Sepulchre
 Tomb of the Virgin Mary

Catholic (Roman and Eastern)
 Annunciation Cathedral – Melkite Greek Catholic
 Church of All Nations or of Agony, Gethsemane
 Church of Bethphage
 Church of Our Lady of the Spasm – Armenian Catholic
 Church of St. John the Baptist (Ein Karem, Jerusalem)
 Church of St. Peter in Gallicantu
 Church of the Condemnation and Imposition of the Cross
 Church of the Flagellation
 Church of the Pater Noster
 Church of the Visitation (Ein Karem, Jerusalem)
 Co-Cathedral of the Most Holy Name of Jesus
 Convent of the Sisters of Zion
 Dominus Flevit Church
 Dormition Abbey
 Ecce Homo (church), part of the Convent of the Sisters of Zion
 Garden of Gethsemane
 Grotto of Gethsemane
 St Anne's Church
 St. Stephen's Basilica (Saint-Étienne)
 St. Thomas Church or Cathedral – Syriac Catholic
 St. Vincent de Paul Chapel, Jerusalem
 Via Dolorosa

Eastern Orthodox

 Church of Maria Magdalene – Russian Orthodox
 Church of St Alexander Nevsky – Russian Orthodox
 Holy Trinity Cathedral in the Russian Compound – Russian Orthodox
 Monastery of the Cross – Greek Orthodox
 Romanian Orthodox Church, part of the Romanian Patriarchy's Representation to the Holy Places
 Convent of the Ascension on the Mount of Olives, with the Church of the Ascension and the Church of the Finding of the Head of St John the Baptist – Russian Orthodox
 St John the Baptist Church – Greek Orthodox
 St. Symeon of Katamonas, church and convent – Greek Orthodox

Oriental Orthodox

 Cathedral of St. James – Armenian Apostolic
 Church of the Holy Archangels – Armenian Apostolic
 Ethiopian Church – Ethiopian Orthodox
 "Deir es-Sultan" Coptic Monastery – Coptic Orthodox, contested by the Ethiopians
 Saint Mark Monastery Of Jerusalem – Syriac Orthodox
 St. Toros Church – Armenian Apostolic

Protestant

 Christ Church
 Ascension Church at the German Augusta Victoria Foundation – Evangelical Church in Germany
 Lutheran Church of the Redeemer – Evangelical Church in Germany
 St. George's Cathedral – Anglican
 St Andrew's, aka the Scottish Church – Church of Scotland.
 The Garden Tomb – non-denominational, but popular with Evangelicals, Anglicans and other Protestants

Islamic

 Haram ash-Sharif (Temple Mount)
 Jami al-Aqsa
 Dome of the Rock
 Well of Souls or Holy of Holies, the cave under the Dome of the Rock
 Dome of the Chain
Fountain of Qayt Bay
Madrasa al-Ashrafiyya
 Al-Khanqah al-Salahiyya Mosque
 Al-Yaqubi Mosque – the Crusader Church of St. James Intercisus, transformed after 1187 into a mosque
 Mosque of Omar, next to the Church of the Holy Sepulchre

Cemeteries

Multi-religious
 Indian War Cemetery, Talpiot
 Jerusalem British War Cemetery
 Mount Herzl National Cemetery – civilian and military
 Tabachnik Garden on Mt Scopus: the main American Colony Cemetery (Protestant) and Bentwich Cemetery (Jewish)

Jewish

 Har HaMenuchot, Givat Shaul 
 Mount of Olives Jewish cemetery
 Sanhedria Cemetery
 Sheikh Badr Jewish Cemetery

Christian
 Mount Zion cemeteries:
 Protestant Mount Zion Cemetery
 other cemeteries on Mount Zion: Armenian Apostolic, Greek Orthodox, Roman Catholic, Muslim
 Templer Cemetery, Emek Refaim

Muslim
 Bab Sitni Mariam Cemetery – Muslim cemetery next to Lions' Gate

See also

 List of East Jerusalem locations
 List of Jerusalem embassies
 List of mosques in Jerusalem
 The Old City gates, an overview

References

External links
 Places in Jerusalem through an Artist's Eyes – Kosinski

Geography of Jerusalem

Jerusalem
Jerusalem
Jerusalem-related lists